NYC Media is the official public radio, television, and online media network and broadcasting service of New York City, which has been called the media capital of the world. The network oversees four public television channels, a public radio station, and an Internet video on demand service.

Located in the Manhattan Municipal Building at 1 Centre Street, NYC Media occupies the tower portion, from the 25th floor to the 29th floor, as well as transmission facilities in the Empire State Building, in the Condé Nast Building in Times Square, and in Brooklyn.

NYC Media is an amalgamation of channels, studios, distribution and production entities. NYC Media was originally called NYC TV when it took over Crosswalks Television in 2003; it became NYC Media Group when it acquired control of broadcast stations WNYE-FM and WNYE-TV as well.

In late 2009, it was announced that NYC Media Group would be split off from the New York City Department of Information Technology and Telecommunications and merge with the Mayor's Office of Film, Theatre and Broadcasting to form the Mayor's Office of Media and Entertainment. As of 2018, the general manager of NYC Media is Janet Choi.

History
In 2003, co-founders Seth Unger and Arick Wierson  both aides to Mayor of New York City Michael Bloomberg  launched NYC-TV, which replaced "Crosswalks Television," the name of the previous network.

In 2005, NYC TV expanded when it acquired WNYE-TV along with the radio station WNYE-FM. The new group was called NYC Media Group. The local cable channels programmed by NYC Media provide coverage of a diverse array of programming formats ranging from local politics and government news on channel 74, traffic camera feeds on channel 72, and ethnic/international programming on channel 73.

NYC Media has received attention as an innovator in municipal broadcasting. Since its inception, NYC Media has been nominated for 160 New York Emmy Awards, winning 42.  It has also won 42 Telly Awards and 4 Promax Awards and was recently nominated for 4 Webby Awards. Cities such as Seoul, Paris, Rio de Janeiro, and Los Angeles have expressed interest in replicating the station's success.
On September 24, 2007 Mayor Bloomberg held a press conference to introduce NYC Media On Demand, a partnership with online video platform Brightcove to offer on demand programming online.

Its main over-the-air broadcast channel, WNYE-TV (channel 25), reaches the New York City metropolitan area, which includes Nassau, Orange, Putnam, Suffolk and Westchester counties in New York state as well as portions of New Jersey and Connecticut.  WNYE-TV is carried on all area cable and satellite systems. NYC Media's main broadcast signal, WNYE-TV, reaches 7.43 million households (approximately 20 million people) in the New York City market, thus making it the fifth largest local television station in the United States.  The main broadcast station is seen in the New York City area on channel 25 on all cable and satellite systems with the exception of Altice USA, where it is seen on channel 22.

Television
NYC Media operates four television channels: NYC life, NYC gov, NYC drive, and NYC world.

  NYC life, is NYC Media's flagship television station and broadcasts as WNYE-TV channel 25.1 as well as appearing on local cable television as channel 22 on Altice USA and on channel 25 on other cable services.
  NYC gov, covers city government meetings and press conferences. It appears on most local cable services as channel 74.
  NYC drive, formerly known as City Drive Live, provides live feeds from traffic cameras. It appears on most local cable services as channel 72.
  NYC world provides international and ethnic programming. It appears on most local cable services as channel 73.

Services on most of these channels had previously each been branded as NYC TV or nyctv with a cable channel number since 2003, and before that as Crosswalks Television.

Radio
NYC Media operates WNYE-FM, branded as "Radio New York".

See also
 WNYE (FM)
 WNYE-TV
 Media of New York City
 New Yorkers in journalism
 Secrets of New York
 Kelly Choi
 Harry Hunkele
 Katherine Oliver

References

Government of New York City
Mass media companies based in New York City
Public broadcasting in the United States
Mass media companies established in 2003
2003 establishments in New York City